Ropotamo Glacier is a glacier extending  from northeast to southwest and  from northwest to southeast on the Burgas Peninsula, Livingston Island in the South Shetland Islands, Antarctica. The glacier is northeast of Dobrudzha Glacier, east-southeast of Iskar Glacier, south of Sopot Ice Piedmont and southwest of Strandzha Glacier. It is bounded by Asen Peak and Delchev Peak to the northwest and north, and flows southeastwards mostly into Yantra Cove, Bransfield Strait.
 
The feature is named after the river Ropotamo in Bulgaria.

Location
Bulgarian mapping in 2005 and 2009.

See also
 List of glaciers in the Antarctic
 Glaciology

Maps
 L.L. Ivanov et al. Antarctica: Livingston Island and Greenwich Island, South Shetland Islands. Scale 1:100000 topographic map. Sofia: Antarctic Place-names Commission of Bulgaria, 2005.
 L.L. Ivanov. Antarctica: Livingston Island and Greenwich, Robert, Snow and Smith Islands. Scale 1:120000 topographic map.  Troyan: Manfred Wörner Foundation, 2009.

References
 Ropotamo Glacier. SCAR Composite Antarctic Gazetteer
 Bulgarian Antarctic Gazetteer. Antarctic Place-names Commission. (details in Bulgarian, basic data in English)

External links
 Ropotamo Glacier. Copernix satellite image

Glaciers of Livingston Island